Piezodorus is a genus of Pentatomidae, a family of shield bugs.

Species
Piezodorus guildinii Westwood 
Piezodorus lituratus (Fabricius, 1794) – gorse shield bug
Piezodorus punctipes Puton, 1889 
Piezodorus rubrofasciatus (Fabricius, 1787) 
Piezodorus teretipes (Stål, 1865)

References 

Pentatomidae genera
Pentatomini